Aaron White (born 1980) is an American actor and director, his most notable work for The Dance: The History of American Minstrelsy, which he co-wrote and co-directed with Jason Christophe White (no relation). He is also an independent music producer, and the owner and founder of Slingshot Media.

He graduated from St. Bernard High School, in Playa Del Rey, CA, in 1998, and is a graduate of The California Institute of the Arts, where he received a Bachelor of Fine Arts in Theater in 2003.

Plays
City Noise (play) (2003)
The Blood They Shed (2004)
The Dance: The History of American Minstrelsy (2005) (Co-Director)

Awards
In 2007, The Dance: The History of American Minstrelsy won an NAACP award for “Best Playwright” with the co-playwrights being Jason Christophe White and Aaron White.

References

External links
In Tha Cut - Official Site

African-American dramatists and playwrights
African-American screenwriters
21st-century American dramatists and playwrights
American male screenwriters
1980 births
Living people
American male dramatists and playwrights
21st-century American male writers
21st-century American screenwriters
21st-century African-American writers
20th-century African-American people
African-American male writers